Partecosta tantilla is a species of sea snail, a marine gastropod mollusk in the family Terebridae, the auger snails.

Description

Distribution
This marine species occurs off Japan.

References

External links
 Smith E.A. (1873). Remarks on a few species belonging to the family Terebridae, and descriptions of several new forms in the collection of the British Museum. Annals and Magazine of Natural History. ser. 4, 11: 262–271

Terebridae
Gastropods described in 1873